Michael Tullis Nolan (born March 7, 1959) is an American football coach who is the head coach for the Michigan Panthers of the United States Football League (USFL). Nolan previously served as a head coach for the San Francisco 49ers, and a defensive coordinator for the National Football League (NFL)'s Baltimore Ravens, New York Jets, Washington Redskins, New York Giants, Denver Broncos, Miami Dolphins, Atlanta Falcons, and Dallas Cowboys. Nolan is a former linebackers coach for the Denver Broncos, San Diego Chargers, and New Orleans Saints.

College years
Nolan attended the University of Oregon and was a three-year letterman in football and starter at safety.

Coaching career

College
He has coached at the collegiate level at Stanford University, Rice University, and LSU before moving on to the National Football League.

Denver Broncos
In 1987, Nolan was hired by the Denver Broncos as a special teams coach under head coach, Dan Reeves. In 1989, he was promoted to linebackers coach.

New York Giants
In 1993, Nolan followed Dan Reeves to the New York Giants and he was hired as defensive coordinator.

Washington Redskins
In 1997, Nolan was hired as defensive coordinator for the Washington Redskins.

New York Jets
In 2000, Nolan was hired by the New York Jets as their defensive coordinator under head coach Al Groh.

Baltimore Ravens
In 2001, Nolan was hired as wide receivers coach for the Baltimore Ravens. He was promoted to defensive coordinator in 2002.

San Francisco 49ers
In 2005, Nolan was hired as the head coach of the San Francisco 49ers, following in his father's footsteps, the former San Francisco 49ers and New Orleans Saints head coach, Dick Nolan. He also served as his own general manager.

Nolan and the 49ers selected Alex Smith with the first overall pick in the 2005 NFL Draft. Nolan thought Smith to be cerebral, introspective, and non-confrontational. Nolan also evaluated Aaron Rodgers, but did not believe that Rodgers's attitude could co-exist with him. Nolan finished the 2005 season with a 4–12 record. The next season, Nolan led a late season run and the 49ers improved to 7–9. That led to expectations for the 2007 season which included at least 9 wins and a playoff appearance. The season started well at 2–0, but an 8-game losing streak ended all hope of a playoff run. During the season, he publicly disagreed with Smith over the severity of the quarterback's shoulder injury. Nolan had been under intense scrutiny in the Bay Area. After the season, Nolan lost his general manager position and on October 20, 2008, Nolan was fired and replaced by his assistant head coach Mike Singletary.

Suit issue
Following his hiring by the 49ers, Nolan asked the NFL for permission to wear a suit and tie on the sidelines as a tribute to his father. The league initially denied Nolan's request because of the contract it had with Reebok for its coaches to wear team-logo attire, a ruling that was changed during Nolan's second season as coach. In the new NFL policy, coaches were allowed to wear a full suit for only two home games per season. The suits were designed, marketed and labeled under the Reebok corporation. Nolan debuted the suit in a game at home against the Seattle Seahawks on November 19, 2006. A day later, Jacksonville Jaguars head coach Jack Del Rio sported another Reebok suit on Monday Night Football.

After further lobbying by Nolan, the NFL and Reebok reached an agreement to allow suits to be worn at all home games in the 2007 season.

After his firing from the 49ers, however, he has simply worn team-issued apparel in all subsequent coaching jobs.

Denver Broncos (second stint)
In early 2009, Nolan was hired by the Denver Broncos as the defensive coordinator under head coach, Josh McDaniels. With a new 3-4 defense the Denver Broncos gave up the fewest points in the NFL (66) during the first six games of the season, and made their way to their first 6–0 start since the 1998 season in which they won Super Bowl XXXIII. The Broncos went 2 and 8 the rest of the way, and missed the playoffs. On January 18, 2010, Mike Nolan and Josh McDaniels mutually decided Nolan would resign as the defensive coordinator of the Denver Broncos.

Miami Dolphins
On January 19, 2010, Nolan was hired by the Miami Dolphins as defensive coordinator. In the 2010 season, the Dolphins finished 14th in points allowed per game (20.8), 6th in yards allowed per game (309.3) and 12th in Football Outsiders' DVOA. In the 2011 season, they finished 6th in points allowed per game (19.6), 15th in yards allowed per game (345.1) and 13th in Football Outsiders' DVOA.

Atlanta Falcons
On January 17, 2012, Nolan was hired by the Atlanta Falcons as defensive coordinator. In the 2012 season, the Falcons finished 5th in points allowed per game (18.7), 24th in yards allowed per game (365.6) and 9th in Football Outsiders' DVOA. In the 2013 season, they finished 27th in both points (27.7) and yards (379.4) allowed per game, and 26th in Football Outsiders' DVOA. In the 2014 season, Atlanta finished 27th in points allowed per game (26.1), 32nd in yards allowed per game (398.2) and 31st in Football Outsiders' DVOA.

San Diego Chargers
In 2015, Nolan was hired by the San Diego Chargers as their linebackers coach.

New Orleans Saints
In 2017, Nolan was hired by the New Orleans Saints as their linebackers coach.

Dallas Cowboys 

On January 5, 2020, Nolan was hired by the Dallas Cowboys as their defensive coordinator. On January 8, 2021, the Cowboys fired Nolan, along with defensive line coach Jim Tomsula after finishing the season with a 6–10 record and allowing a franchise-record 473 points.

Michigan Panthers 
On February 3, 2023, it was announced that Mike Nolan was hired by the Michigan Panthers of United States Football League (USFL) to be their head coach, succeeding Jeff Fisher.  This will be Nolan's first head coaching job since 2008 with the 49ers.

Head coaching record

NFL

USFL

Personal life 
Nolan is married to Kathy, and has four children, Michael, Matthew, Jennifer and Christopher. He may possibly be a devout but this link is incorrect Roman Catholic. His sons are sometimes seen on the sidelines. He also has three brothers and two sisters. 

Nolan attended Bellarmine College Preparatory in San Jose, California and Woodside High School, the alma mater of Julian Edelman.

Nolan's father, former 49ers and Saints coach Dick Nolan, died at age 75 on November 11, 2007, just a day before Mike's 49ers were to take on the Seattle Seahawks.  Nolan decided to coach the Monday Night Football game in honor of his dad.

References

1959 births
Living people
American football safeties
American Roman Catholics
Atlanta Falcons coaches
Baltimore Ravens coaches 
Dallas Cowboys coaches
Denver Broncos coaches
LSU Tigers football coaches
Miami Dolphins coaches
Michigan Panthers (2022) coaches
National Football League defensive coordinators 
New Orleans Saints coaches
New York Giants coaches
New York Jets coaches
Oregon Ducks football coaches
Oregon Ducks football players
Rice Owls football coaches
San Diego Chargers coaches
San Francisco 49ers head coaches
Sportspeople from Baltimore
Stanford Cardinal football coaches
Washington Redskins coaches